The  is a railway line operated by East Japan Railway Company (JR East) which connects  to .

Both the Tobu and JR East railway stations in Nikkō are located within walking distance of each other.

Station list
 Trains can pass each other at any station.

Rolling stock
 E131-600/-680 series 3-car EMUs (since 12 March 2022)

Former rolling stock
 107 series 2-car EMUs (until 15 March 2013)
 205-600 series 4-car EMUs (x4) (from 16 March 2013 to 11 March 2022)

History

The Nippon Railway Co. opened the line in 1890 and was nationalised in 1906. The line was electrified in 1959, and CTC signalling was commissioned in 1970. Freight services ceased in 1984.

Former connecting lines
 Tsuruta Station:
The Tochigi Prefectural Government opened a 3 km  gauge line to Nishihara-cho in 1897, extending it 10 km to Yoshihara in 1899 and opening a 4 km branch to Tokujiro the following year. Handcar passenger services commenced on both lines from opening, operating until 1928. A 7.5 km branch from Nishihara-cho to Tateiwa was opened in 1898 to haul gravel.

In 1931, the lines were purchased by the Tobu Railway Co. which closed all but the Tateiwa branch, which it converted to  gauge and built a connection to Nishi-Kawada station on the Tobu Utsunomiya Line. The Tateiwa branch ceased operation in 1961 following a landslide and was formally closed in 1964.

 Nikko Station:
The Nikko Electric Railway Co. opened an 8 km line electrified at 600 V DC to Iwanohana between 1907 and 1913, and extended it 2 km to Umakae (approximately 300 m higher than Nikko) in 1931 to connect to a 1.2 km funicular railway that climbed 428 m which opened in 1932. In 1944, electric locomotives began hauling copper ore on the line. Freight tonnage decreased 25% between 1964 and 1966, and passenger numbers decreased by 17% over the same period, resulting in the line closing in 1968. The funicular railway closed in 1970.

References

External links

 Stations of the Nikkō Line (JR East) 

 
Lines of East Japan Railway Company
Rail transport in Tochigi Prefecture
1067 mm gauge railways in Japan
Railway lines opened in 1890